Lilienthal Island is one of the Donovan Islands, lying just north of Glasgal Island in Vincennes Bay, Antarctica. The island was mapped from air photographs taken by U.S. Navy Operation Highjump, 1946–47, and was named by Carl R. Eklund for Billie R. Lilienthal, U.S. Navy, aerographer at Wilkes Station, 1957.

See also 
 List of antarctic and sub-antarctic islands

References

Islands of Wilkes Land